Give War a Chance: Eyewitness Accounts of Mankind's Struggle Against Tyranny, Injustice and Alcohol-Free Beer is a 1992 book by American writer P J O'Rourke.
The pieces in the book start with reports about glasnost  and end with his accounts as a reporter for Rolling Stone on the Gulf War.

References

1992 non-fiction books
American essay collections
Atlantic Monthly Press books